The 2020 Troy Trojans football team represented Troy University in the 2020 NCAA Division I FBS football season. The Trojans played their home games at Veterans Memorial Stadium in Troy, Alabama, and competed in the East Division of the Sun Belt Conference. They were led by second-year head coach Chip Lindsey.

Schedule
Troy had games scheduled against Arkansas–Pine Bluff, NC State, Tennessee, and UMass, but were canceled due to the COVID-19 pandemic.

Game summaries

at Middle Tennessee

at BYU

Texas State

Eastern Kentucky

Georgia State

at Arkansas State

at Georgia Southern

Middle Tennessee

at Appalachian State

at South Alabama

Coastal Carolina

References

Troy
Troy Trojans football seasons
Troy Trojans football